William Hitz (April 21, 1872 – July 3, 1935) was an Associate Justice of the United States Court of Appeals for the District of Columbia and previously was an associate justice of the Supreme Court of the District of Columbia.

Education and career

Born in Washington, D.C., Hitz received his undergraduate education from Harvard University, and received a Bachelor of Laws from Georgetown Law in 1900. He was in private practice in Washington, D.C. from 1900 to 1914 and was a special attorney at the United States Department of Justice from 1914 to 1916.

Federal judicial service

Hitz received a recess appointment from President Woodrow Wilson on November 15, 1916, to an Associate Justice seat on the Supreme Court of the District of Columbia (now the United States District Court for the District of Columbia) vacated by Associate Justice Thomas H. Anderson. He was nominated to the same position by President Wilson on December 15, 1916. He was confirmed by the United States Senate on January 2, 1917, and received his commission the same day. His service terminated on February 13, 1931, due to his elevation to the District of Columbia Circuit.

Hitz was nominated by President Herbert Hoover on January 5, 1931, to the Court of Appeals for the District of Columbia (United States Court of Appeals for the District of Columbia from June 7, 1934, now the United States Court of Appeals for the District of Columbia Circuit), to a new Associate Justice seat authorized by 46 Stat. 785. He was confirmed by the United States Senate on January 28, 1931, and received his commission on February 6, 1931. His service terminated on July 3, 1935, due to his death.

References

Sources
 

1872 births
1935 deaths
Harvard College alumni
Judges of the United States District Court for the District of Columbia
United States district court judges appointed by Woodrow Wilson
Judges of the United States Court of Appeals for the D.C. Circuit
United States court of appeals judges appointed by Herbert Hoover
20th-century American judges
Georgetown University Law Center alumni
People from Washington, D.C.